Chris Timberlake (born April 28, 1985) is a Filipino-American former basketball player who last played for the Blackwater Elite of the Philippine Basketball Association (PBA). He was selected 7th overall in the 2009 PBA draft by the Barangay Ginebra Kings.

PBA career statistics

Correct as of October 28, 2013

Season

|-
| align="left" | 2009–10
| align="left" | Purefoods/B-Meg Derby Ace
| 30 || 8.6 || .338 || .182 || .588 || .8 || .9 || .3 || .0 || 2.0
|-
| align="left" | 2010–11
| align="left" | B-Meg Derby Ace
| 9 || 7.9 || .200 || .000 || .250 || .8 || .3 || .4 || .0 || 1.0
|-
| align="left" | 2011–12
| align="left" | Meralco
| 24 || 12.4 || .283 || .263 || .667 || .6 || 1.5 || .4 || .1 || 1.9
|-
| align="left" | 2012–13
| align="left" | Meralco / GlobalPort
| 15 || 14.0 || .364 || .000 || .800 || 1.6 || 1.4 || .5 || .1 || 2.1
|-
| align="left" | 2013–14
| align="left" | GlobalPort / Meralco
| 16 || 14.8 || .265 || .286 || 1.000 || 1.2 || 1.1 || .1 || .1 || 1.8
|-
| align="left" | Career
| align="left" |
| 94 || 11.4 || .303 || .225 || .688 || .9 || 1.1 || .3 || .1 || 1.9

References

1988 births
Living people
Basketball players from Washington, D.C.
Filipino men's basketball players
Meralco Bolts players
North Florida Ospreys men's basketball players
Magnolia Hotshots players
Point guards
NorthPort Batang Pier players
Blackwater Bossing players
American men's basketball players
Barangay Ginebra San Miguel draft picks
American sportspeople of Filipino descent
Citizens of the Philippines through descent